Thomas Feeney McQueen (born 1 April 1963) is a Scottish former footballer who played as a defender. His primary position was full back.

McQueen began his career with Clyde, making over 100 appearances in all competitions, before moving to Aberdeen in 1984, where he made 53 appearances, scored four goals and was part of the 1986 Scottish Cup winning team. He left the Scotland temporarily in 1987 to play for West Ham, but returned to Scotland in 1990 to play again for Falkirk and Dundee in 1994.

McQueen was the only footballer to win medals in all three divisions in the 1975–1994 three-division structure of the SFL (with Clyde, Falkirk and Aberdeen).
  
, McQueen was co-owner of a haulage firm in Glasgow with former Falkirk player Roddy Manley.

Honours
Clyde
Scottish Second Division: 1981–82

Aberdeen
Scottish Premier Division: 1984–85
Scottish Cup: 1985–86

Falkirk
Scottish First Division: 1990–91, 1993–94
Scottish Challenge Cup: 1993–94

References

External links

Living people
1963 births
Scottish footballers
Clyde F.C. players
Aberdeen F.C. players
West Ham United F.C. players
Falkirk F.C. players
Dundee F.C. players
Scottish Football League players
English Football League players
Association football fullbacks